The Moravian Thaya is a river in the Czech Republic and in Austria, and a  left tributary of the Thaya.

From there it flows southward through or near the communities of Bezděkov, Panenská Rozsíčka, Urbanov, Žatec, Dyjice, Radkov, and Černíč in the Vysočina Region.

In Austria, it joins the German Thaya at the city of Raabs an der Thaya. From there, the unified Thaya river flows generally eastward and re-enters the Czech Republic.

References

External links 

  Moravská Dyje hydrological data

Rivers of Lower Austria
Rivers of the Vysočina Region
Rivers of the South Bohemian Region
International rivers of Europe
Moravia
Rivers of Austria